Streptochlora is a genus of green algae in the family Chaetophoraceae.

References

Chaetophorales genera
Chaetophoraceae